Phesheya Mbongeni Dlamini (born 1 January 1966 in Lobamba) has been the Ambassador and Permanent Representative of Swaziland to the United Nations since 8 September 2005. Previously, he had been Swaziland's Attorney-General in the Ministry of Justice and Constitutional Development since 1999, as well as Chairman of the Legal Group of the Eastern and Southern African Anti-Money Laundering Group from 2003 to 2005.

References

External links
"STATEMENT BY H.E. MR. PHESHEYA MBONGENI DLAMINI, AMBASSADOR AND PERMANENT REPRESENTATIVE OF SWAZILAND TO THE UNITED NATIONS, AT THE GENERAL DEBATE OF THE SIXTY-FIRST SESSION OF THE UNITED NATIONS GENERAL ASSEMBLY", 27 September 2006.

1966 births
Living people
Permanent Representatives of Eswatini to the United Nations
People from Lobamba